Karim Salman  (4 March 1965 – 2 December 2020) was an Iraqi football defender.

He played for Iraq in the 1988 Summer Olympics. He played for the national team between 1988 and 1993.

Salman died from COVID-19 on 2 December 2020, aged 55, during the COVID-19 pandemic in Iraq.

Managerial statistics

References

Iraqi footballers
Iraq international footballers
Footballers at the 1988 Summer Olympics
Olympic footballers of Iraq
Association football defenders
1965 births
2020 deaths
Deaths from the COVID-19 pandemic in Iraq